KNH or knh may refer to:

 Kamla Nehru Hospital, a hospital located in Gandhi Medical College campus, Madhya Pradesh, India
 Kenyatta National Hospital, the oldest hospital in Kenya
 KNH, the IATA code for Kinmen Airport, Fujian, Republic of China
 KNH, the Telegram code for Kunshan South railway station, Jiangsu, China